The Institut Jeanne d'Arc, also Den Franske Skole, was a French-language Roman Catholic school at 74 Frederiksberg Allé in the Frederiksberg district of central Copenhagen, Denmark. The bombing killed 86 children and 19 adults.

History
Designed by the Danish architect Christian Mandrup-Poulsen (1865–1952), the school was established on 1 August 1924 by the Danish Sisters of St. Joseph who arrived in Denmark in 1856. They had already established another school, the Institut Sankt Joseph in the Østerbro district of Copenhagen in 1858. The three-winged red-brick building, consisting of four stories and a mansard, housed 29 classrooms.

Mistaken bombing
On 21 March 1945, in response to a request by the Danish resistance that the Copenhagen Gestapo headquarters should be destroyed, 20 RAF Mosquitos left for Copenhagen on a mission designated Operation Carthage. The target was Shellhuset (The Shell House) on Kampmannsgade in the city centre, which housed the Gestapo.

Two of the Mosquitos in the second wave mistook the burning structure as having been successfully bombed by the first wave, and dropped their bombs on the French School, killing 86 children and 19 adults and wounding 67 children and 35 adults.

Aftermath
The school was destroyed by the bombing and the remaining buildings were demolished. Today, six apartment buildings stand on the site. The remaining pupils were transferred to the Institut Sankt Joseph which was subsequently expanded. In 1953, a monument created by Max Andersen was erected on the site.

In popular culture
The Danish movie The Shadow in My Eye (Skyggen i mit øje in Danish), telling the story of the raid and the school's destruction, was released in October 2021 in Denmark. Netflix released the movie on its streaming service in March 2022, as The Bombardment.

References

Educational institutions established in 1924
Roman Catholic schools in Copenhagen
1924 establishments in Denmark
Former buildings and structures in Frederiksberg Municipality
Buildings and structures in Denmark destroyed during World War II
World War II sites in Denmark
Disasters in Copenhagen
Explosions in Denmark